André Larivière (born 1948) is an ecologist and anti-nuclear activist from Quebec, Canada. He has lived in Europe since 1986 and was a leading speaker for the French Sortir du nucléaire network. In February 2010, he has been elected member of the board of trustees.

He has participated in 3 extended fasts:
 1983, 40 days fast for disarmament in San Francisco, USA, with 12 other people in the Fast for Life movement.
 1986, 31 days fast in front a US military base of Mutlangen, Germany, asking for removal of Pershing missiles.
 2004, 36 days fast in Paris asking for a "real democratic debate" on nuclear energy and the withdrawal of the third generation nuclear reactor project, European Pressurized Reactor or EPR, with Dominique Masset and Michel Bernard.

He has organized and participated in many walks and protest actions, mainly in France and Germany.

Publication 
André Larivière, Carnets d'un militant, Éditions Éco-Société, 1997.

See also
 List of peace activists

References

1948 births
Living people
Canadian anti–nuclear power activists
Canadian environmentalists
Hunger strikers
Sustainability advocates